Department Against Misappropriation of Socialist Property (shortly The OBKhSS) was the Soviet financial police. It was responsible for the regulation of economic laws fight against theft of property in the organizations and institutions of state commerce, consumer, industrial and individual co-operatives, savings banks and procurement agencies, as well as to fight against speculation.
 
OBKhSS was established as a department of the Main Police Department of the NKVD USSR on March 16, 1937 in Order of the People's Commissar No. 0018. From 1946 to 1991 under the authority of The Ministry of Internal Affairs of the USSR.

Currently Successor of the OBKhss in similar function is the OBEP - The Department for fighting against Economic crimes of MVD and the DEB - Department for Economic Security.

Gallery

See also
Militsiya
MVD

Economy of the Soviet Union
Law enforcement in the Soviet Union